Jānis Ķipurs (sometimes shown as Yanis Kipurs or Janis Kipurs, born 3 January 1958 in Kurmene, Kurmene parish) is a Latvian bobsledder who competed for the Soviet Union in the late 1980s. At the 1988 Winter Olympics in Calgary, he won two medals with a gold in the two-man event and a bronze in the four-man event.

Ķipurs also won a bronze medal in the two-man event at the 1989 FIBT World Championships in Cortina d'Ampezzo.

He won the two-man Bobsleigh World Cup championship in 1987–88.

Because of his successes, the ice rink in his hometown of Sigulda (now part of Latvia) was named in his honor.

References

External links
 Bobsleigh two-man Olympic medalists 1932-56 and since 1964
 Bobsleigh four-man Olympic medalists for 1924, 1932-56, and since 1964
 Bobsleigh two-man world championship medalists since 1931
 DatabaseOlympics.com profile
 List of combined men's bobsleigh World Cup champions: 1985-2007
 List of two-man bobsleigh World Cup champions since 1985

1958 births
Living people
People from Bauska Municipality
Soviet male bobsledders
Latvian male bobsledders
Bobsledders at the 1984 Winter Olympics
Bobsledders at the 1988 Winter Olympics
Olympic bobsledders of the Soviet Union
Olympic gold medalists for the Soviet Union
Olympic bronze medalists for the Soviet Union
Olympic medalists in bobsleigh
Medalists at the 1988 Winter Olympics